The Men's 94 kg weightlifting event at the 2014 Commonwealth Games in Glasgow, Scotland, took place at Scottish Exhibition and Conference Centre on 29 July. The contest was won by Steven Kari. The silver medal was won by Simplice Ribouem and the bronze medal was won by Chandrakant Mali.

Result

References

Weightlifting at the 2014 Commonwealth Games